Stade Abdelaziz Chtioui is a football stadium in La Marsa, Tunisia.  It is currently used by football team Avenir Sportif de La Marsa.  The stadium holds 6,500 people.

Marsa Abdelaziz Chtioui